Kim Yeong-uk (born 2 March 2000) is a South Korean footballer currently playing as a right-back for Jeonnam Dragons FC.

Career statistics

Club

Notes

References

2000 births
Living people
South Korean footballers
Association football defenders
K League 2 players
Jeju United FC players